Mike Boyd (born February 6, 1947) is an American basketball coach. He is a former Cleveland State University head coach, and is currently an assistant at East Tennessee State University. Boyd was hired at Cleveland State to replace Kevin Mackey in September 1990, and resigned on March 25, 1996. He has also been an interim head coach at Kent State, and an assistant coach at Kent State, Michigan, and Penn State. At the end of the 2012–2013 school year Boyd retired from coaching.

Head coaching record

References

External links
 East Tennessee State profile

1947 births
Living people
Cleveland State Vikings men's basketball coaches
East Tennessee State Buccaneers men's basketball coaches
Kent State Golden Flashes men's basketball coaches
Michigan Wolverines men's basketball coaches
Northern Michigan Wildcats men's basketball players
Penn State Nittany Lions basketball coaches
American men's basketball players